Krzysztof Trybusiewicz (born 30 January 1949) is a Polish modern pentathlete. He competed at the 1976 Summer Olympics.

References

1949 births
Living people
Polish male modern pentathletes
Olympic modern pentathletes of Poland
Modern pentathletes at the 1976 Summer Olympics
People from Susz
Sportspeople from Warmian-Masurian Voivodeship